The 2018 Tennessee gubernatorial election took place on November 6, 2018, to elect the next governor of Tennessee. Republican Bill Lee was elected with nearly 60% of the vote. Incumbent Republican Governor Bill Haslam was term-limited, and is prohibited by the Constitution of Tennessee from seeking a third consecutive term.

The primaries took place on August 2, 2018, with Republican Bill Lee and Democrat Karl Dean winning their respective party nominations.

After the general election, the results marked the first time since 1982 that a candidate from the incumbent president’s party was elected governor of Tennessee. This is also the first time that Republicans won three consecutive gubernatorial elections in the state, and the first time that a Republican was elected to succeed another Republican.

This large surge in candidates was mostly due to the Libertarian Party of Tennessee's protest of the state's party affiliation and ballot access laws.

Republican primary

Candidates

Nominated
 Bill Lee, businessman

Eliminated in primary
 Diane Black, U.S. Representative
 Randy Boyd, former Tennessee cabinet official
 Beth Harwell, Speaker of the Tennessee House of Representatives
 Basil Marceaux, perennial candidate
 Kay White, realtor and Democratic nominee for Tennessee's 1st congressional district in 1996 and 1998

Withdrawn
 Mae Beavers, former state senator (unsuccessfully ran for Wilson County Mayor)
 Mark Green, state senator (successfully ran in Tennessee's 7th congressional district)

Declined
 Marsha Blackburn, U.S. Representative (successfully ran for the U.S. Senate)
 Tim Burchett, Mayor of Knox County (successfully ran in Tennessee's 2nd congressional district)
 Joe Carr, former state representative, perennial candidate
 Bob Corker, U.S. Senator
 Stephen Fincher, former U.S. Representative
 Alberto Gonzales, dean of the Belmont University School of Law and former U.S. Attorney General
 Bill Hagerty, United States Ambassador to Japan and former Tennessee cabinet official
 Tre Hargett, Tennessee Secretary of State
 Rob Mitchell, Rutherford County property assessor
 Mark Norris, Majority Leader of the Tennessee Senate, appointed as judge to the United States District Court for the Western District of Tennessee
 Andy Ogles, director of Tennessee chapter of Americans for Prosperity (successfully ran for Mayor of Maury County)
 Ron Ramsey, former Lieutenant Governor of Tennessee and candidate for Governor of Tennessee in 2010

Endorsements

Polling

Results

Democratic primary

Candidates

Nominated
 Karl Dean, former Mayor of Nashville, 2007–2015

Eliminated in primary
 Craig Fitzhugh, Minority Leader of the Tennessee House of Representatives
 Mezianne Vale Payne, retiree

Declined
 Andy Berke, Mayor of Chattanooga and former state senator
 Bill Freeman, businessman and candidate for Mayor of Nashville in 2015

Endorsements

Polling

Results

Independents

Candidates
 Mark CoonRippy Brown (Independent)
 Sherry L. Clark (Libertarian)
 Justin Cornett (Libertarian)
 Gabriel Fancher (Libertarian)
 Sean Bruce Fleming (Libertarian)
 William Andrew Helmstetter (Libertarian)
 Cory King (Libertarian)
 Matthew Koch (Libertarian)
 Yvonne Neubert (Green)
 Alfred Shawn Rapoza (Libertarian)
 Chad Riden, comedian (Independent)
 Heather Scott (Libertarian)
 George Blackwell Smith IV (Libertarian)
 Jeremy Allen Stephenson (Libertarian)
 Tracy Yaste Tisdale (Libertarian)
 Mike Toews (Libertarian)
 Rick Tyler, candidate for TN-03 in 2016
 Vinnie Vineyard (Funkmaster V from Wrestling With Ghosts)  (Libertarian)
 Jaron D. Weidner (Libertarian)
 Joe B. Wilmoth (Independent)
Patrick Whitlock (Independent)

Notes

General election

Debates
Complete video of debate, October 2, 2018
Complete video of debate, October 12, 2018

Endorsements

Predictions

Polling

with Karl Dean

with Craig Fitzhugh

Results

|}

References

External links
 Candidates at Vote Smart
 Candidates at Ballotpedia

Official campaign websites
 Karl Dean (D) for Governor
 Bill Lee (R) for Governor
 Chad Riden (I) for Governor
 Vinnie Vineyard (L) for Governor

Gubernatorial
2018
2018 United States gubernatorial elections